Juan Lobato Gandarias (born 5 November 1984) is a Spanish Socialist Workers' Party (PSOE) politician. First elected as a councillor in Soto del Real in 2003, he was the town's mayor from 2015 to 2021. He served in the Assembly of Madrid from 2015 to 2019 and again from 2021, becoming his party's leader in the region.

Biography
Born in Madrid, Lobato graduated in Business Management and Administration, and Law, from the Autonomous University of Madrid. He was the mayor of Soto del Real from 2015 to 2021, having first been elected to the city council in 2003 when he was 18, and a deputy in the Assembly of Madrid from 2015 to 2019. From 2010, he worked as a State Treasury Technician for the State Tax Administration Agency.

In 2017, he was a candidate for secretary general of the Spanish Socialist Workers' Party (PSOE) in the Community of Madrid. He came second, with 19.74% of the vote, behind José Manuel Franco.

Lobato was put in fourth place on the PSOE's list for the 2021 Madrilenian regional election, led by Ángel Gabilondo. He resigned as mayor of Soto del Real in April, before being re-elected to the Assembly in May. He and Irene Lozano were made the party's assistant spokespeople, behind Hana Jalloul.

In September 2021, Lobato put himself forward again as a candidate for secretary general. He was elected in October, with 61.23% of the votes, ahead of the mayor of Fuenlabrada, Francisco Javier Ayala. Also becoming spokesman of the party in the Assembly of Madrid, he offered to pact with regional president Isabel Díaz Ayuso (PP) so that the budget could be passed without compromises towards Vox.

References

 

1984 births
Living people
Politicians from Madrid
Autonomous University of Madrid alumni
Spanish Socialist Workers' Party politicians
Mayors of places in the Community of Madrid
Members of the 10th Assembly of Madrid
Members of the 12th Assembly of Madrid
Members of the Socialist Parliamentary Group (Assembly of Madrid)